Neverita delessertiana is a species of predatory sea snail, a marine gastropod mollusk in the family Naticidae, the moon snails.

N. delessertiana was long considered to be merely a form of the much more common and much more widely distributed species Neverita duplicata.  In 2006 a paper was published which made it clear that Neverita delessertiana is a different species than N. duplicata.

Distribution
This species is found in the United States in Florida, Alabama, Mississippi, Louisiana and Texas.

Description 
The maximum recorded shell length is 67.5 mm.

Habitat 
The minimum recorded depth for this species is 0 m; the maximum recorded depth is 0 m.

References

Naticidae
Gastropods described in 1843